Warisata is a location in the La Paz Department in Bolivia.

References

External links 
 Achacachi municipality: population data and map

Populated places in La Paz Department (Bolivia)